Okemah Lake is a reservoir in Okemah, Oklahoma. The lake is located to the north of the town, east of IXL.

Recreation 
The lake is a popular fishing, boating and camping location. There are a number of boat ramps, a public park and an RV campsite located at the lake.

References 

Okemah
Okemah